Joel Michael Yates (April 10, 1938 – April 15, 2019), known as J. Michael Yates, was a Canadian poet, dramatist, fiction writer, and corrections officer.

Early life and career

Yates was born in Fulton, Missouri and raised in Germany. He did graduate degrees at the Universities of Missouri and Michigan, and received an honorary doctorate from Ohio University. Yates emigrated to Vancouver, British Columbia in 1966.

Yates was a widely published author of poetry, fiction, drama, translations, and philosophical essays. He has edited several anthologies and founded and edited several literary magazines. His work has been translated into most of the western languages and several of the eastern ones and his drama for radio, television, and stage have been produced both nationally and internationally. His last rank as a university professor was Distinguished Professor.

He won many literary prizes including the Major Hopwood Awards (both poetry and drama the same year) and the Lifetime Achievement Award in the Arts and Sciences from University of Missouri, The Look of Books (for Volvox: Poetry from the Unofficial Languages of Canada in English Translation), The Olympic Arts Award for Schedules of Silence.

He has also been a logger, a powder monkey, a motorcycle racer, a broadcasting executive, a broadcaster, an advertising executive, a print salesman, a commercial photographer, a publisher. He retired after seventeen years as a Maximum Security Prison Guard and SWAT team member, and taught languages, history of ideas, and science with his wife in their home in Vancouver.

Death

Yates died on April 15, 2019, at his home in Vancouver. He was survived by his wife and two stepsons.

Bibliography

Poetry
Spiral of Mirrors - 1967
Hunt in an Unmapped Interior - 1967
Cantacle for Electronic Music - 1967
Parallax - 1971
The Great Bear Lake Meditations - 1971 
Nothing Speaks for the Blue Moraines - 1973
Breath of the Snow Leopard - 1974
The Qualicum Physics - 1975
Esox Nobilior Non Esox Lucius - 1978
Fugue Brancusi - 1983
Insel: The Queen Charlotte Islands Meditations - 1983
Various Northern Meditations - 1984
The Completely Collapsible Portable Man - 1984
Schedules of Silence - 1986 
During - 1999
Hongyun: New and Collected Shorter Poems 1955-2005 - 2005

Fiction
Man in the Glass Octopus - 1968
Fazes in Elsewhen - 1976
Torque - 1988 
Torpor: Collected Fiction, 1960-1987 - 1989

Fiction and drama
The Abstract Beast - 1971

Drama
Night Freight - 1975

Non-fiction
Line Screw: Memoir of a Prison Guard - 1994

Anthologies
Light Like a Summons - 1990

Awards
International Broadcasting Award, 1960 and 1961
Major Hopwood Award for Poetry and Drama from the University of Michigan, 1964
Look of Books Award, 1972
Lifetime Achievement Award in the Arts and Sciences from the University of Missouri
The Writer's Choice Award, 1988
The Vancouver Award for Line Screw [1994]

References

External links
Official Site
 Archives of J. Michael Yates (J. Michael Yates fonds, R11834) are held at Library and Archives Canada

1938 births
2019 deaths
20th-century Canadian poets
Canadian male poets
21st-century Canadian poets
20th-century Canadian dramatists and playwrights
University of Missouri alumni
University of Michigan alumni
Writers from Missouri
Writers from Vancouver
Canadian male dramatists and playwrights
20th-century Canadian male writers
21st-century Canadian male writers